The members of the 41st General Assembly of Newfoundland were elected in the Newfoundland general election held in April 1989. The general assembly sat from May 25, 1989 to April 5, 1993.

The Liberal Party led by Clyde Wells formed the government.

Thomas Lush served as speaker.

There were five sessions of the 41st General Assembly:

James McGrath served as lieutenant governor of Newfoundland until 1991. Frederick Russell succeeded McGrath as lieutenant governor.

Members of the Assembly 
The following members were elected to the assembly in 1989:

Notes:

By-elections 
By-elections were held to replace members for various reasons:

Notes:

References 

Terms of the General Assembly of Newfoundland and Labrador